The Shrine Bowl Provincial Championships is a high school varsity football playoff championship, in the province of British Columbia, Canada; from the years 1966 to 1975.

History 
The old varsity high school Vancouver & District Inter-High School Football League Senior Championships (1934 to 1965) became the Shrine Bowl Provincial Championships (1966 to 1975). The championships were held at the old Empire Stadium (Vancouver) in the province of British Columbia.

During the Shrine Bowl years, all high school football teams started to play by the same American football rules. A small Catholic high school, by the name of Notre Dame Regional Secondary School, became a football powerhouse during those years.

The Shrine Bowl gave way to the American style of ranking schools. Schools are divided into three classes by total enrollment in grades 9-11 only: A (0-337 students), AA(340-618 students), and AAA (619 students and up). The championships then became known as Frank Gnup AAA Provincial Championships and the Gary Scott AA Provincial Championships.

Shrine Bowl Provincial Champions

See also
 Delbrook Senior Secondary School

References
 (2005) Subway Bowl program, p. 25

External links
"Varsity Champions of the Past" 

High school football in Canada
Canadian football competitions
Canadian football in British Columbia